Angel Reese (born May 6, 2002) is an American college basketball player for the LSU Tigers of the Southeastern Conference (SEC). She attended St. Frances Academy in Baltimore, Maryland, where she was awarded with McDonald's All-American honors in 2020 and was ranked the number two player in her class by ESPN. Reese joined Maryland as the best recruit in program history but her freshman season in 2020–21 was interrupted by a fractured right foot. She was named a Third-team All-American by the Associated Press as a sophomore, before transferring to LSU. She was named a First-team All-American by the Associated Press and United States Basketball Writers Association (USBWA) as a Junior.

Early life and high school career
Reese was born on May 6, 2002, in Randallstown, Maryland, to Angel and Michael Reese. She grew up taking part in ballet, swimming and track, in addition to basketball. Reese played the point guard position before having two growth spurts by her first year of high school. She attended St. Frances Academy in Baltimore, Maryland, where she was a four-year varsity basketball player. Early in her high school career, Reese was teammates with Nia Clouden. As a freshman, she averaged 11.1 points and 11 rebounds per game, earning All-Metro first team honors from The Baltimore Sun. Reese posted 20 points and 24 rebounds in a 56–55 overtime loss to Hamilton Heights Christian Academy at the High School Nationals semifinals. 

In her sophomore season, Reese was an All-Metro first team selection after averaging 17.6 points and 12.1 rebounds per game. As a junior, she averaged 22.6 points and 19.3 rebounds per game and was named All-Metro Player of the Year. In her senior season, she averaged 18.6 points, 10.2 rebounds, 3.4 assists and 2.5 blocks per game, repeating as All-Metro Player of the Year. Reese won her fourth straight Interscholastic Athletic Association of Maryland (IAAM) A Conference title. She was named to the McDonald's All-American Game and Jordan Brand Classic rosters. Reese left St. Frances with the second-most career points in program history. Her number 10 jersey number was retired by the program, and she became the first player to receive the honor. Reese competed for Team Takeover on the Amateur Athletic Union circuit and helped the team win the Nike Elite Youth Basketball League championship in 2019. She played volleyball for St. Frances, with whom she won two IAAM titles.

Recruiting
Reese was considered a five-star recruit, the number two player and the top wing in the 2020 class by ESPN. On November 1, 2019, she committed to play college basketball for Maryland over offers from South Carolina, USC, Syracuse and Tennessee. Reese became the highest-ranked recruit in program history. She was drawn to the program in part by her relationship with head coach Brenda Frese, who had recruited her when she was in eighth grade.

College career

On November 27, 2020, Reese made her debut for Maryland, recording a freshman season-high 20 points and nine rebounds in a 94–72 win over Davidson. In her fourth game of the season, on December 3 against Towson, she suffered a Jones fracture in her right foot. She underwent surgery and was sidelined until February 23, 2021. Reese came off the bench following her return from injury. As a freshman, she averaged 10 points and six rebounds per game, earning Big Ten All-Freshman honors. Reese assumed a greater role in her sophomore season, developing into one of the top offensive rebounders in the nation. In her season debut on November 9, she recorded 21 points and 14 rebounds in a 97–67 win against Longwood. On December 2, 2021, Reese posted a season-high 26 points and 15 rebounds in an 82–74 win over Miami (Florida). She led Maryland to the Sweet 16 of the 2022 NCAA tournament, where she had 25 points and nine rebounds in a 72–66 loss to top-seeded Stanford. As a sophomore, Reese averaged 17.8 points and 10.6 rebounds per game, becoming the first Maryland player to average a double-double since 1975 when Angie Scott did the same. She was named to the First Team All-Big Ten and the All-Defensive Team. Reese received Third Team All-American honors from the Associated Press and made the United States Basketball Writers Association (USBWA) All-American honorable mention. On April 5, 2022, she entered the transfer portal with several of her teammates. She was the most heralded transfer in the nation and took visits to LSU, South Carolina and Tennessee.

On May 6, 2022, Reese transferred to LSU, as announced by the program, which competes in the Southeastern Conference (SEC). She made the decision due to her trust in head coach Kim Mulkey and a desire to join a winning culture. In her junior season, Reese emerged as one of the best players in the nation. On November 7, she made her debut for LSU, recording 31 points and 13 rebounds in a 125–50 win over Bellarmine. On December 14, Reese posted a career-high 32 points and 15 rebounds in an 88–42 victory over Lamar. On January 5, 2023, she scored 26 points and grabbed 28 rebounds in a 74–34 win over Texas A&M. She surpassed LSU's single-game rebounding record, held by Maree Jackson since 1977. On January 23, Reese had her 20th straight double-double, with 14 points and 14 rebounds in an 89–51 win against Alabama. She broke the program record for consecutive double-doubles, set by Sylvia Fowles during the 2006–07 season.

Career statistics

College

|-
| style="text-align:left;"| 2020–21
| style="text-align:left;"| Maryland
| 15 || 4 || 15.1 || .467 || .167 || .671 || 6.0 || 1.1 || 0.6 || 1.3 || 1.5 || 10.0
|-
| style="text-align:left;"| 2021–22
| style="text-align:left;"| Maryland
| 32 || 31 || 25.9 || .500 || .182 || .683 || 10.6 || 1.5 || 1.7 || 1.1 || 2.5 || 17.8

Source

Personal life
Reese's mother, Angel, who raised her as a single parent with the help of her own parents, played basketball for UMBC and professionally in Luxembourg. Her father, Michael, competed for Boston College and Loyola (Maryland) before embarking on a professional career. Reese and her younger brother, Julian, were competitive rivals when they practised together. He plays college basketball for Maryland and he competed for St. Frances Academy. Her stepbrother, Mikael Hopkins is a professional basketball player. 

Reese majored in communications at the University of Maryland, College Park and aspires to be a television commentator after her basketball career. She was a member of the honor roll in high school. Reese has signed name, image and likeness (NIL) deals with several companies, including Amazon, Xfinity, Outback Steakhouse, Wingstop and supermarket chain Giant Food. In February 2023, she signed an NIL deal with fashion brand Coach and gave bags to her teammates at LSU.

Reese is nicknamed the "Bayou Barbie" by LSU fans. In her first year at the school, she filed for a trademark on the nickname.

References

External links
LSU Tigers bio
Maryland Terrapins bio
USA Basketball bio

2002 births
Living people
American women's basketball players
Basketball players from Baltimore
People from Randallstown, Maryland
Shooting guards
Small forwards
McDonald's High School All-Americans
Maryland Terrapins women's basketball players
All-American college women's basketball players